Uncle Vanya is a play by the Russian playwright Anton Chekhov. It was first published in 1898, and was first produced in 1899 by the Moscow Art Theatre under the direction of Konstantin Stanislavski.

The play portrays the visit of an elderly professor and his glamorous, much younger second wife, Yelena, to the rural estate that supports their urban lifestyle. Two friends—Vanya, brother of the professor's late first wife, who has long managed the estate, and Astrov, the local doctor—both fall under Yelena's spell, while bemoaning the ennui of their provincial existence. Sonya, the professor's daughter by his first wife, who has worked with Vanya to keep the estate going, suffers from her unrequited feelings for Astrov. Matters are brought to a crisis when the professor announces his intention to sell the estate, Vanya and Sonya's home, with a view to investing the proceeds to achieve a higher income for himself and his wife.

Background
Uncle Vanya is unique among Chekhov's major plays because it is essentially an extensive reworking of his own play published a decade earlier, The Wood Demon. By elucidating the specific changes Chekhov made during the revision process—these include reducing the cast from almost two dozen down to nine, changing the climactic suicide of The Wood Demon into the famous failed homicide of Uncle Vanya, and altering the original happy ending into a more ambiguous, less final resolution—critics such as Donald Rayfield, Richard Gilman, and Eric Bentley have sought to chart the development of Chekhov's dramaturgical method through the 1890s.

Rayfield cites recent scholarship suggesting Chekhov revised The Wood Demon during his trip to the island of Sakhalin, a prison colony in Eastern Russia, in 1891.

Characters
 Aleksandr Vladimirovich Serebryakov: a retired university professor, who has lived for years in the city on the earnings of his late first wife's rural estate, managed for him by Vanya and Sonya.
 Helena Andreyevna Serebryakova (Yelena): Serebryakov's young and beautiful second wife. She is 27 years old.
 Sofia Alexandrovna Serebryakova (Sonya): Serebryakov's daughter from his first marriage. She is of a marriageable age, but is considered plain.
 Maria Vasilyevna Voynitskaya: the widow of a privy councilor and mother of Vanya (and of Vanya's late sister, Serebryakov's first wife).
 Ivan Petrovich Voynitsky ("Uncle Vanya"): Maria's son and Sonya's uncle, the title character of the play. He is 47 years old.
 Mikhail Lvovich Astrov: a middle-aged country doctor. His preoccupation with the destruction of forests is one of the first discussions of ecological problems in world literature.
 Ilya Ilych Telegin (nicknamed "Waffles" for his pockmarked skin): an impoverished landowner, who now lives on the estate as a dependent of the family.
 Marina Timofeevna: an old nurse.
 A Workman

Plot

Act I
A garden on Serebryakov's country estate. Astrov and Marina discuss how old Astrov has grown and his boredom with his life as a country doctor. Vanya enters and complains of the disruption caused by the visit of the professor and his wife Yelena. As they're talking, Serebryakov, Yelena, Sonya, and Telegin return from a walk. Out of earshot of the professor, Vanya calls him "a learned old dried mackerel", criticizes his pomposity, and belittles his achievements. Vanya's mother, Maria Vasilyevna, who idolises Serebryakov, objects to her son's comments. Vanya also praises Yelena's youth and beauty, arguing that faithfulness to an old man like Serebryakov is an immoral waste of vitality. Astrov is forced to depart to attend a patient, but not before delivering a speech on the preservation of the forests, a subject he is very passionate about. Vanya declares his love to an exasperated Yelena.

Act II
The dining room, several days later, late at night. Before going to bed, Serebryakov complains of pain and old age. Astrov arrives, having been sent for by Sonya, but the professor refuses to see him. After Serebryakov falls asleep, Yelena and Vanya talk. She speaks of the discord in the house, and Vanya speaks of dashed hopes. He feels he's misspent his youth and he associates his unrequited love for Yelena with the disappointment of his life. Yelena refuses to listen. Alone, Vanya wonders why he did not fall in love with Yelena when he first met her ten years earlier, when it would have been possible for the two of them to marry and have a happy life together. At that time, Vanya believed in Serebryakov's greatness and was happy that his efforts supported Serebryakov's work; he has since become disillusioned with the professor and his life feels empty. As Vanya agonises over his past, Astrov returns, somewhat drunk, and the two talk. Sonya chides Vanya for his drinking, and responds pragmatically to his reflections on the futility of a wasted life, pointing out that only work is truly fulfilling.

Outside, a storm is gathering and Astrov talks with Sonya about the house's suffocating atmosphere; he says Serebryakov is difficult, Vanya is a hypochondriac, and Yelena is charming but idle. He laments how long it has been since he loved anyone. Sonya begs Astrov to stop drinking, telling him it is unworthy of him to destroy himself. They discuss love, and it becomes clear that Sonya is in love with him and that he is unaware of her feelings.

When Astrov leaves, Yelena enters and makes peace with Sonya, after an apparently long period of mutual antagonism. Trying to resolve their difficulties, Yelena reassures Sonya that she had strong feelings for her father when she married him, though that love has proved illusory. The two converse at cross purposes. Yelena confesses her unhappiness and Sonya gushes about Astrov. In a happy mood, Sonya leaves to ask the professor if Yelena may play the piano. Sonya returns with his negative answer, which quickly dampens the mood.

Act III

Vanya, Sonya, and Yelena are in the living room, having been called there by Serebryakov. Vanya calls Yelena a water nymph and urges her, once again, to break free. Sonya complains to Yelena that she has loved Astrov for six years but that, because she is not beautiful, he doesn't notice her. Yelena volunteers to question Astrov and find out if he's in love with Sonya. Sonya is pleased, but before agreeing she wonders whether uncertainty is better than knowledge, because then, at least, there is hope.

When Yelena asks Astrov about his feelings for Sonya, he says he has none and concludes that Yelena has brought up the subject of love to encourage him to confess his own feelings for her. Astrov kisses Yelena, and Vanya witnesses the embrace. Upset, Yelena begs Vanya to use his influence to allow her and the professor to leave immediately. Before Serebryakov can make his announcement, Yelena tells Sonya that Astrov doesn't love her.

Serebryakov proposes to solve the family's financial problems by selling the estate and investing the proceeds in a bond which will bring in a significantly higher income (and, he hopes, leave enough over to buy a villa for himself and Yelena in Finland). Angrily, Vanya asks where he, Sonya, and his mother would live, protests that the estate rightly belongs to Sonya, and that Serebryakov has never appreciated his self-sacrifice in managing the property. As Vanya's anger mounts, he begins to rage against the professor, blaming him for the failure of his life, wildly claiming that, without Serebryakov to hold him back, he could have been a second Schopenhauer or Dostoevsky. In despair, he cries out to his mother, but instead of comforting her son, Maria insists that Vanya listen to the professor. Serebryakov insults Vanya, who storms out of the room. Yelena begs to be taken away from the country and Sonya pleads with her father on Vanya's behalf. Serebryakov exits to confront Vanya further. A shot is heard from offstage and Serebryakov returns, being chased by Vanya, wielding a loaded pistol. He fires the pistol again at the professor but misses. He throws the gun down in disgust and sinks into a chair.

Act IV
As the final act opens, a few hours later, Marina and Telegin wind wool and discuss the planned departure of Serebryakov and Yelena. When Vanya and Astrov enter, Astrov says that in this district only he and Vanya were "decent, cultured men" and that ten years of "narrow-minded life" have made them vulgar. Vanya has stolen a vial of Astrov's morphine, presumably to commit suicide; Sonya and Astrov beg him to return the narcotic, which he eventually does.

Yelena and Serebryakov bid everyone farewell. When Yelena says goodbye to Astrov, she admits to having been carried away by him, embraces him, and takes one of his pencils as a souvenir. Serebryakov and Vanya make their peace, agreeing all will be as it was before. Once the outsiders have departed, Sonya and Vanya pay bills, Maria reads a pamphlet, and Marina knits. Vanya complains of the heaviness of his heart, and Sonya, in response, speaks of living, working, and the rewards of the afterlife: "We shall hear the angels, we shall see the whole sky all diamonds, we shall see how all earthly evil, all our sufferings, are drowned in the mercy that will fill the whole world. And our life will grow peaceful, tender, sweet as a caress…. You've had no joy in your life; but wait, Uncle Vanya, wait…. We shall rest."

Productions

Constantin Stanislavski played the role of Astrov while Chekhov's future wife Olga Knipper played Yelena. The initial reviews were favorable but pointed to defects in both the play and the acting. As the staging and the acting improved over successive performances, however, and as "the public understood better its inner meaning and nuances of feeling", the reviews improved. Uncle Vanya became a permanent fixture in the Moscow Art Theatre.

Other actors who have appeared in notable stage productions of Uncle Vanya include Michael Redgrave, Paul Scofield, Peter O'Toole, Albert Finney, Franchot Tone, Cate Blanchett, Peter Dinklage, Jacki Weaver, Antony Sher, Ian McKellen, Richard Armitage, Simon Russell Beale, William Hurt, George C. Scott, Donald Sinden, Derek Jacobi, Michael Gambon, Tom Courtenay, Trevor Eve and Laurence Olivier.

The play was also adapted as the new stage-play Dear Uncle by the British playwright Alan Ayckbourn, who reset it in the 1930s Lake District. This adaptation premiered from July to September 2011 at the Stephen Joseph Theatre.

In January 2014 24/6: A Jewish Theater Company performed TuBishVanya, a modern adaption that incorporated Jewish and environmental themes.

Parodies

 The Fifth Elephant, a 1999 novel by Terry Pratchett, includes a pastiche of Chekhov plays in which "the gloomy and purposeless trousers of Uncle Vanya" are loaned to Captain Vimes.

 Life Sucks: Or the Present Ridiculous, a 2015 stage adaptation by Aaron Posner, premiered at Theater J in Washington, DC.

 The Reduced Shakespeare Company performed a shortened version of the play on their BBC radio show in 2010 that contained only three lines:
"Are you Uncle Vanya?"
"I am."
[Gunshot sounds]
"Ouch!"

 Uncle Vanya and Zombies, a 2012 post-apocalyptic stage adaptation by Markus Wessendorf, premiered at Kennedy Theatre in Honolulu.

Other adaptations
Over the years, Uncle Vanya has been adapted for film several times.
 Uncle Vanya, a 1957 adaptation of a concurrent Off-Broadway production that starred Franchot Tone, who co-produced and co-directed the film
 Uncle Vanya, a version of the star-studded 1962–63 Chichester Festival stage production, directed for the stage by Laurence Olivier, who played Astrov, and also starring Michael Redgrave as Vanya, Max Adrian as Professor Serebryakov, Rosemary Harris as Yelena and Olivier's wife Joan Plowright as Sonya. Harold Hobson of The Sunday Times described the Chichester production as "the admitted master achievement in British twentieth-century theatre" while The New Yorker called it "probably the best 'Vanya' in English we shall ever see".
 Uncle Vanya, a 1970 Russian film version, adapted and directed by Andrei Mikhalkov-Konchalovsky.
 Uncle Vanya, a 1991 episode of the BBC Performance anthology for TV, starring Ian Holm and David Warner
 Vanya on 42nd Street, a 1994 American film version, adapted by David Mamet and directed by Louis Malle. It stars Wallace Shawn and Julianne Moore. Originally a little-known studio production, it was later adapted for the screen, where it garnered wider acclaim.
 Country Life, a 1994 Australian adaptation, set in the Outback, starring Sam Neill as the equivalent of Astrov.
 August, a 1996 English film adaptation, set in Wales, directed by and starring Anthony Hopkins in the Vanya role. Hopkins played Astrov in a BBC Play of the Month production in 1970.
Sonya's Story, an opera adapted by director Sally Burgess, composer Neal Thornton and designer Charles Phu, portraying events in the play Uncle Vanya from the character Sonya's perspective, premiered in 2010.
Chekhov: Fast & Furious, a multimedia theatric performance project by the Franco-Austrian performance collective Superamas which translates the themes of the “old” theatre into our time. Premiered in 2018 at the Vienna Festival in Austria.
 Uncle Vanya, a recording of the interrupted 2020 run at London's Harold Pinter Theatre, adapted by Conor McPherson, starring Aimee Lou Wood, Rosalind Eleazar, Roger Allam, Toby Jones, and Richard Armitage. Due to the COVID-19 pandemic, it was decided to bring the cast back under guidelines and film the play for release in cinemas and later on the BBC.
Morbror Vanja, a Swedish language adaptation of the play, was performed at the Åbo Svenska Teater (Turku, Finland) in 2021.
 Drive My Car, a 2021 film by Ryusuke Hamaguchi, includes a production of Uncle Vanya, with the characters echoing the emotional turmoil of Chekhov's characters as they reveal their trauma and deeply complicated feelings. It is based on a short story collection by Haruki Murakami.

Awards and nominations 

Awards
 2003 Laurence Olivier Award for Best Revival
Nominations
 1992 Laurence Olivier Award for Best Revival
 2000 Drama Desk Award Outstanding Revival of a Play

See also 
 Chekhov's gun

References

Further reading

External links

 
 
 Productions in Theatre Archive, University of Bristol
 Full text of Uncle Vanya 
 Uncle Vanya program note from 1957 San Francisco International Film Festival
 Full English translation via the Gutenberg Project

1897 plays
1899 plays
Plays by Anton Chekhov
Broadway plays
Off-Broadway plays
Laurence Olivier Award-winning plays
West End plays
Russian plays adapted into films
Male characters in theatre
Theatre characters introduced in 1897
Fictional Russian people